The Holy Books of Thelema is a collection of 15 works by Aleister Crowley, the founder of Thelema, originally published in 1909 by Crowley under the title , and later republished in 1983, together with a number of additional texts, under the new title, The Holy Books of Thelema, by Ordo Templi Orientis under the direction of Hymenaeus Alpha.

Content 
The Holy Books of Thelema consists of the wholly class A libri of Aleister Crowley, which indicates that they that are not to be changed, even to the letter. According to Crowley, they were not so much written by him as through him, and are therefore referred to as inspired works. Additionally, Liber LXI, a class D text, is included as an introduction after a preface by Hymenaeus Alpha and synopsis compiled from Crowley's writings. Liber LXI was originally class A, then changed to class B, indicating works of scholarship, then changed to class D, indicating official rituals and instructions. Liber I was originally a Class B document but was reclassified as class A in 1913, and so it is included in The Holy Books of Thelema. The majority of these texts were written between the years 1907 and 1911. They are listed in numerical order, following their designation in Roman numerals, with the exception of Liber XXXI which immediately follows Liber CCXX.

The Book of the Law 
Liber AL vel Legis, also known as the Book of the Law, is the foundational text for Thelema. It is included in both Liber CCXX and Liber XXXI. The latter is the handwritten original, while Liber CCXX was transcribed from the original and was given the number 220 because it is composed of 220 verses. It is the only Holy Book that Aleister Crowley claimed to have had no part in the authorship of. Its primacy is indicated in chapter 3, verse 47: 

The Comment is sometimes considered to be part of the Book of the Law; at other times, it is considered to be a different document. In either instance, it has been understood by some to mean that no discussion of any of the Holy Books may take place, despite the fact that the Comment, which was written after all of the Holy Books were written, only applies to the Book of the Law. According to this interpretation, the purpose of the Comment is to allow others to interpret the Book of the Law for themselves; in other words, no one is to preach its contents or tell you their understanding of it is the one true understanding. However, the Comment also prohibits the study of the Book of the Law. The stated punishment for violating the Comment is anathema (shunning).

Original contents of Θελημα 
 Volume I
 Liber LXI vel Causæ
 Briefly explains the history and origin of Thelema and the A∴A∴.
 Liber LXV Cordis Cincti Serpente sub figurâ 
 An account of the relations of the aspirant and his Holy Guardian Angel.

 Volume II
 Liber Liberi vel Lapidis Lazuli, Adumbratio Kabbalae Aegyptiorum sub figurâ VII
 These are the birth words of a Master of the Temple. Its 7 chapters are referred to the 7 planets in the following order: Mars, Saturn, Jupiter, Sol, Mercury, Luna, Venus.

 Volume III
 Liber Trigrammaton sub figurâ XXVII
 A book of trigrams of the mutations of the tao with the yin and yang. An account of the cosmic process.
 Liber AL vel Legis sub figurâ CCXX, commonly called the Book of the Law
 Among the Holy Books of Thelema, the chief is the Book of the Law. Every Thelemite is expected to interpret the book "each for himself".
 Liber DCCCXIII vel Ararita sub figurâ DLXX
 An account of the hexagram and the method of reducing it to the unity and beyond. This book describes in magical language a very secret process of initiation.

Additional texts included in The Holy Books of Thelema 
 Liber B vel Magi sub figurâ I
 An account of the Grade of Magus, the highest grade which it is even possible to manifest in any way whatsoever upon this plane.
 Liber Porta Lucis sub figurâ X
 An account of the sending forth of the Master Therion by the A∴A∴ and an explanation of his mission.
 Liber AL (Liber Legis) sub figurâ XXXI, commonly called the Book of the Law
 A facsimile of the handwritten manuscript of the Book of the Law; includes the Comment.
 Liber Stellæ Rubeæ sub figurâ LXVI
 Sexual magick veiled in symbolism.
 Liber Tzaddi vel Hamus Hermeticus sub figurâ XC
 An account of Initiation, and an indication as to those who are suitable for the same.
 Liber Cheth vel Vallum Abiegni sub figurâ CLVI
 Sexual magick veiled in symbolism.
 Liber Arcanorum     sub figurâ CCXXXI Liber Carcerorum   cum suis Geniis
 An account of the cosmic process so far as it is indicated by the Tarot Trumps. The sequence of the 22 Trumps is explained as a formula of Initiation.
 Liber A’ash vel Capricorni Pneumatici sub figurâ CCCLXX
 Analyzes the nature of the creative magical force in man, explains how to awaken it, how to use it and indicates the general as well as the particular objects to be gained thereby. Sexual magick veiled in symbolism.
 Liber Tau vel Kabbalæ Trium Literarum
 A graphic interpretation of the Tarot on the plane of Initiation.

Other holy books of Thelema 
Three libri containing class A material (but which are not wholly class A) are excluded from the collection, namely: Liber CDXV — Opus Lutetianum (commonly called the Paris Working); Liber XXX  vel Sæculi sub figurâ CDXVIII (commonly called The Vision and the Voice); and Liber  sub figurâ DCCCCLXIII (commonly called the Treasurehouse of Images).

Stèle of Revealing 
Despite its significance to Thelema, the Stèle of Revealing (also called Stèle 666) is not listed as one of The Holy Books of Thelema, however, it is included in Appendix A alongside supplementary materials. Crowley purports to have authored the text in a past incarnation as the ancient Egyptian priest Ankh-f-n-khonsu.

See also 
Great Work

References

Sources 

 
Crowley, Aleister (1996). Commentaries on the Holy Books and other Papers (The Equinox Vol. IV No. 1). York Beach, ME: Samuel Weiser.
Free Encyclopedia of Thelema (2005). Holy Books of Thelema. Retrieved March 27, 2005.
Thelemapedia (2005). The Holy Books of Thelema. Retrieved on 03/11/05.

1909 books
Thelemite texts
Works by Aleister Crowley
Series of books